All Africa Men's and Women's Team Badminton Championships is a continental stage tournament of Thomas and Uber Cups, organized by the Badminton Confederation of Africa (BCA), to crown the best national men's and women's badminton teams in Africa. The winner of this tournament will be represented BCA at the Thomas and Uber Cup finals.

Hosts

Medalists

References 

 
International badminton competitions
Badminton tournaments in Africa
Recurring sporting events established in 2004
2004 establishments in Africa